Gibberulus is a genus of sea snails, marine gastropod mollusks in the family Strombidae, the true conchs.

Species
Species within the genus Gibberulus include:
 Gibberulus albus (Mörch, 1850)
Gibberulus gibberulus (Linnaeus, 1758)
Species brought into synonymy
Gibberulus gibbosus (Röding, 1798): synonym of Gibberulus gibberulus gibbosus (Röding, 1798)

References

 Liverani V. (2014) The superfamily Stromboidea. Addenda and corrigenda. In: G.T. Poppe, K. Groh & C. Renker (eds), A conchological iconography. pp. 1–54, pls 131-164. Harxheim: Conchbooks.

External links
 Jousseaume F. (1888). Description des mollusques recueillis par M. le Dr. Faurot dans la Mer Rouge et le Golfe d’Aden. Mémoires de la Société Zoologique de France. 1: 165-223
 Maxwell, S. J.; Hernandez Duran, L. C.; Rowell, M. K.; Rymer, T. L. (2021). An iconography of extant Gibberulus Jousseaume, 1888 (Mollusca, Gastropoda, Strombidae), and the introduction of a new species from the southwestern Pacific. Proceedings of the Biological Society of Washington. 134(1): 89-115

Strombidae